Daniel Gimeno-Traver won last year's edition, but decided not to participate this year.
Top seed Marcel Granollers won in the final match and became the new champion. He defeated Jaroslav Pospíšil 1–6, 7–5, 6–0.

Seeds

Draw

Finals

Top half

Bottom half

References
 Main Draw
 Qualifying Draw

Singles
2010 ATP Challenger Tour